is a Japanese tokusatsu television series which serves as the 8th entry in the Metal Hero Series franchise, and the first entry in the Heisei period. Produced by Toei and aired by TV Asahi in Japan from January 29, 1989, to January 28, 1990, it ran for 52 episodes and a feature movie aired on July 17, 1989. According to Toei's International Sales & Promotion Department, the series' English title can be referred to as Jiban.

The premise for the series combines elements from the American film RoboCop and the 1970s tokusatsu Robot Detective.
Jiban was also aired in the Philippines on IBC from 1992 to 1993.

Plot

Naoto Tamura, a new detective in Central City, is killed by a Bionoid Monster in the line of duty. Doctor Kenzo Igarashi, a man whose experiments had been responsible for the Bioron syndicate's existence, brought the man back to life as a cyborg detective, Jiban. Eventually, Madogarbo and Rhinonoid killed Jiban, who returned to life again as Perfect Jiban (basically the same design as the original, but with a blue-colored metal body and three new weapons). In the finale, Biolon destroyed Jiban's base and transformed Madogarbo into a false Jiban. Jiban defeated his duplicate and ultimately Gibanoid, the true form of Biolon's leader Doctor Giba. The victorious Jiban then learned that Mayumi Igarashi, the one civilian that knew his secret, had been his missing younger sister all along.

Characters

 Naoto Tamura/Mobile Cop Jiban  A human revived as a cyborg by Doctor Igarashi to fight Biolon. He is capable of reverting to his human identity at will. He holds the rank of deputy police commissioner (as a robot) and detective (as human). Jiban's programming enables him to follow these directives:
 Arrest criminals in any circumstance without a warrant.
 Punish criminals on his own judgment if they happen to be members of Bioron.
 Use lethal force depending on the circumstances.
In human form, Naoto often plays the fool and is looked on down by Youko and Kiyoshiro for this, but Youko begins to warm up to him after realizing he could be Jiban. In the Filipino Dubbing Version, His name was Marco Tamura. 
 Mayumi Igarashi  The only civilian who knew Jiban's secret identity. She lost her memory in battle, after falling from a waterfall, because, Madogarbo gave her a Bomb Ring. If Jiban approaches her, the bomb will burst. She called Naoto her 'big brother,' only to find that she was really his lost sister in the finale.
 Shun'ichi and Shizue Igarashi  Mayumi's (adoptive) parents. Shunichi is the son of Doctor Kenzou Igarashi but is not a scientist. Relocated as witnesses to Biolon, they resumed their life as Mayumi's foster parents in the finale.
 Doctor Kenzo Igarashi  Started the Jiban's project to counter Bioron, the results of his biological experimentation and he designed Jiban's high mobility system weapon Daedalus. He pass away when Jiban was built.
 Youko Katagiri  A female detective of Central City. Naoto's senior. Manly sharpshooter who could not figure out that Naoto was Jiban. She is also known in the Filipino Dubbed Version as Loren.
 Kiyoshiro Muramatsu  Elite detective of Central City with a liking for Youko.
 Seiichi Yanagida  The head of the Police Department. He cooperated with Doctor Igarashi in the Jiban Project two years earlier. He collaborated with Jiban after Igarashi's death. He died when Jiban's base was destroyed.
 Section Chief Takeko Bando  The Central City Section Chief of Detectives. Got headaches trying to keep the peace in jurisdictions where strange events occurred, no thanks to Biolon.
 Michiyo Matsumoto  A tea server of the Detectives' Section of Central City Police Department. She is always cheerful and encouraging.
 Boy/Harry Boy  Jiban's robotic assistant. He stays at his secret base. Originally he was simply Boy, an immobile camera-like robot who had to give instructions to Mayumi to operate the control center, but then his computer was transferred to panda-like "Harry" (a robot devised by another student of Doctor Igarashi's) and began substituting for the amnesiac Mayumi. He died when Jiban's base was destroyed.
 Ryo Hayakawa  A drifter who takes in Mayumi after she loses her memory, mistaking her for his dead sister, Midori. He initially refers to her by that name but later refers to her by her own name Mayumi after reading a missing person's notice, although Mayumi does not tell him her true origins (since her memory is faulty). In the scuffle, Mayumi goes away, unable to remember what just happened. He died in Episode 46, when Jiban removed the Bomb Ring from Mayumi's finger with a very precise shot, without hurting her. Ryou took the ring and ran, to throw it out, but was killed in the resulting explosion. He is played by Ryouhei Kobayashi Who would later play Fumiya Hoshikawa / Five Black in the 1990 sentai series Chikyu Sentai Fiveman.

Equipment
 Jiban's Badge  It can be used as a communicator to contact Harry Boy, Seiichi and Mayumi in Jiban's Base or used to summon any of his vehicles, as well as to control their armaments electronically.

Articles

Every episode, when Jiban faces his Bionoid enemy, he ejects his badge from his waist and shows it to the monster, reading a code of articles and laws that serve as his directives (much like RoboCop's prime directives), but unlike the movie, they giving him a greater freedom instead of restricting him:

Super Police Vehicles
 Super Police Machine Reson  Jiban's patrol car, a modified Pontiac Firebird with a sixth generation computer and hence a will of its own, and it was destroyed by Gibanoid.
 Super Police Bike Vaican  Jiban's Suzuki motorcycle with a sixth generation computer and hence a will of its own, and it was destroyed by Gibanoid. In the Philippine Version, it is known as Mecha Panther and in the English  Version, it is known as Bikan
 Super Police Jet Spylas  Jiban's stealth fighter plane with a will of its own, and it was destroyed by Doctor Giba using his ship's weapon systems.

Weapons
 Spikes  It is hidden in Jiban's upper arms to puncture and break a hold or to shoot.
 Jiban Hyper Beam  It is hidden in Jiban's upper arms to shoot into areas that cannot be accessed through physical means (example: doors). Jiban used it in the movie.
 Maximillian Type 3  Jiban's personal jutte-like weapon. Concealed in a collapsible holster located on his right leg, it can transform into either Pistol, Stun Gun, or Sword Mode.

The Maximillian Type 3 can also perform the following moves and techniques:

 Disclose Shock  It is used in stun gun mode, essentially a stun gun.
 Last Shooting/ThermalBeam/Search Buster  It is used in pistol mode, firing laser shots.
 Jiban End (Energy sword)  It is used in sword mode, splits enemies in half. It is also known as Jiban Slash in the Filipino Version and in the English  Version, it is known as JIBAN HAKEN GRASH.
 Daedalus  Jiban's personal cannon.  Required to perform the Daedalus Bombard Technique, which is used to finish off foes.  It can be made into a Jetpack jet to enable Jiban to fly short distances.
 Autoderringer  Jiban's personal rifle. He acquired it after being resurrected as Perfect Jiban. It has a machine gun mode and a bazooka mode. The machine gun mode is used to stun and set up the enemy; after an "Energy Charge" in which the bazooka is charged, it fires a powerful shot to finish off the enemy. It was destroyed by Gibanoid during Jiban's final fight with him.
 Powerbreaker  Pincer/claw. A left arm attachment. It can be used to attack enemies. He acquired it after being resurrected as Perfect Jiban.
 Needricker  Drill.  A right arm attachment. It can be used to drill into areas that cannot be accessed through physical means (e.g. doors). He acquired it after being resurrected as Perfect Jiban.

Criminal Syndicate Bioron
An armed force organized by the mysterious scientist Doctor Giba intending to take over the Earth by means of narrow attacks rather than large-scale destruction. Their theme/weapon is biochemistry.
 Doctor Giba  The bearded brown-haired Caucasian human-looking leader and founder of Bioron. His real identity is Gibanoid, a bio-monster born by accident from the chemical waste of Doctor Igarashi's National Science Academy Bio Laboratory. As a result, Giba is filled with malice for humans. He assumed his true form in the series finale, using Mayumi as a shield to escape in his ship. He died while fighting Jiban on his ship as it crashed into the mountainside.
 Marsha and Karsha  The first bio-lifeforms created by Kiba, his secretaries and intermediaries between him and his Bionoid agents. They can transform into small spiders (for spying on people), and assume their inhuman "Battle" forms (Battle Marsha and Battle Karsha), armed with energy whips. They were killed in the series finale by Doctor Giba for failing to kill Jiban.
 Bubi and Muku (Pugui and Muguie in the Brazilian dub) The cute and not so-cute creatures living in Bioron's base. Muku was one of Jiban's foes in early chapters, in giant size, but only as a distraction. The 4 critters had a tendency to annoy Marsha and Karsha with their Commentary of what the 2 recently did during that episode. Sometimes just showing up once to be used as target practice by the Bionoids demonstrating their powers. The four became friends with Mayumi when she told them about a mother's love and she tried to defend them from Marsha and Karsha who attacked the critters for saving Mayumi's life by Defusing the bomb in Fake Momnoid. They hung out with Mayumi in the finale.
 Madogarbo (17-51)  A Jiban Cyborg Killer created by Doctor Giba as a counter to Jiban. Using power from Queen Cosmos, she and Rhinonoid are able to kill Jiban in Episode 34, but he is resurrected as Perfect Jiban. She later assumes his total appearance to attack him by having his Reson, Spylas and Vaican attack Jiban making them believe Jiban was Madogarbo. She even got as far as damaging Jiban so badly that he went Blind but Mayumi's Despair at seeing her brother about to be killed caused what energy of Queen Cosmos was left to gather and blast Fake Jiban turning her back into regular Madogarbo she was then killed by Jiban.
 Kuro Kiba  Mad Garbo's motorcycle with rhino horn and sidecar with machine guns. In the English  Version, it is known as Black Fang.
 Queen Cosmos (28-46)  A lunar life form resembling a human woman (but actually a floating rock like starfish with a long tail) intent on conquering Earth to establish an all-woman empire. She appeared in episode 28 but did not reveal her name till episode 34. In her own words, she is made of space garbage and came from a place that was cold and ugly, lacking anything beautiful, thus her obsession with having everything beautiful and being called beautiful herself. She is more powerful than the other Biorons (except Doctor Giba himself); she allies with them to destroy Jiban. Her jewelry turns into parasite creatures: Earring into a skull patterned ladybug that would infuse into Jiban distorting his circuitry and her Brooch would turn into a spider creature blasting Jiban with tiny powerful balls of light. Her bracelet was able to transform into a snake creature wrapping around one's neck to control their mind. In Episode 46, she was defeated by Jiban.
 Golem Cosmos (37)  An offshoot of Queen Cosmos herself, this entity was created to be her champion from a piece of herself. The creature was extremely powerful, armed with a crescent sword and shield, she very nearly defeated Jiban Until he grabbed her sword wrist with Powerbreaker, twisting her wrist and impaling her with Needricker. She then turned back into her clay statue state and dissolved. Weapons: A long silvery sword, shield, energy blasts from sword and laser blasts from eyes.
 Masques  The mass-produced grunt human-like life forms armed with knives, guns, machine guns and bazooka. They can disguise themselves as humans and regenerate lost limbs. A determined human (usually Yoko and sometimes Kiyoshiro) can take them out by shooting them in the head or chest or by physically choking them out.

Bionoid 
Bionoids are the product of Doctor Giba's research. They can disguise themselves as humans.
 Chamelenoid (1)
 Catnoid (2)
 Mudnoid (3)
 Rosenoid (4)
 Octopusnoid (5)
 Vulturenoid (6)
 Influenzanoid (7)In the English Version, it is known as Coldnoid
 Molenoid (8)
 Hyenanoid (9)
 Nightmarenoid (10)
 Hedgehognoid (11)
 Skunknoid (13)
 Killernoid (14)
 Wolfnoid (15)
 Jellyfishnoid (16)
 Agehanoid (17)
 Starfishnoid (18)
 Injectnoid (19)
 Moneynoid (20)
 Bugnoid (21)
 Hunternoid (22)
 Goatnoid (23)
 Suicidenoid (24)
 Explodenoid (25)
 Dragonnoid (26)
 Centipedenoid (27)
 Elephanoid (28)
 Doublenoid (29)
 Kabukinoid (30)
 Shinobinoid (31)
 Distnoid (32)
 Electric Fishnoid (33) In the English Version, it is known as Snakeheadnoid
 Rhinonoid (34-35)
 Chambaranoid (36) In the English Version, it is known as Swordfightnoid
 Tortoinoid (37)
 Mushroonoid (38)
 HermitCrabnoid (39)
 Panthernoid (40)
 Anacondanoid (41) In the English Version, it is known as Drunknoid
 Tyrannosaurusnoid (42)
 Catfishnoid (42)
 Cobranoid (43)
 Suitorunoid (44) In the English Version, it is known as Absorbnoid
 Squidnoid (45)
 Unicornnoid (47)
 TempleBellnoid (48)
 Fakemomnoid (49)
 Great Gibanoid (Movie)
 Batblock (Movie)
 Ammoblock (Movie)
 Spiderblock (Movie)

Episodes
: written by Noboru Sugimura, directed by Michio Konishi
: written by Noboru Sugimura, directed by Michio Konishi
: written by Noboru Sugimura, directed by Akihisa Okamoto
: written by Kunio Fujii, directed by Akihisa Okamoto
: written by Noboru Sugimura, directed by Kiyohiko Miyasaka
: written by Susumu Takaku, directed by Kiyohiko Miyasaka
: written by Kunio Fujii, directed by Michio Konishi
: written by Nobuo Ogizawa, directed by Michio Konishi
: written by Susumu Takaku, directed by Kaneharu Mitsumura
: written by Kunio Fujii, directed by Kaneharu Mitsumura
: written by Noboru Sugimura, directed by Akihisa Okamoto
: written by Susumu Takaku, directed by Akihisa Okamoto
: written by Noboru Sugimura, directed by Michio Konishi
: written by Kunio Fujii, directed by Michio Konishi
: written by Nobuo Ogizawa, directed by Akihisa Okamoto
: written by Susumu Takaku, directed by Akihisa Okamoto
: written by Noboru Sugimura, directed by Michio Konishi
: written by Noboru Sugimura, directed by Michio Konishi
: written by Noboru Sugimura, directed by Akihisa Okamoto
: written by Noboru Sugimura, directed by Akihisa Okamoto
: written by Susumu Takaku, directed by Kaneharu Mitsumura 
: written by Susumu Takaku, directed by Kaneharu Mitsumura
: written by Nobuo Ogizawa, directed by Akihisa Okamoto
: written by Susumu Takaku, directed by Akihisa Okamoto
: written by Noboru Sugimura, directed by Takeshi Ogasawara
: written by Nobuo Ogizawa, directed by Takeshi Ogasawara
: written by Noboru Sugimura, directed by Michio Konishi
: written by Noboru Sugimura, directed by Michio Konishi
: written by Nobuo Ogizawa, directed by Akihisa Okamoto
: written by Kyoko Sagiyama, directed by Akihisa Okamoto
: written by Susumu Takaku, directed by Kaneharu Mitsumura
: written by Kunio Fujii, directed by Kaneharu Mitsumura
: written by Kyoko Sagiyama, directed by Michio Konishi
: written by Noboru Sugimura, directed by Michio Konishi
: written by Noboru Sugimura, directed by Akihisa Okamoto
: written by Nobuo Ogizawa, directed by Akihisa Okamoto
: written by Noboru Sugimura, directed by Michio Konishi
: written by Nobuo Ogizawa, directed by Michio Konishi
: written by Noboru Sugimura, directed by Takeshi Ogasawara
: written by Susumu Takaku, directed by Takeshi Ogasawara
: written by Kenichi Araki, directed by Kaneharu Mitsumura
: written by Nobuo Ogizawa, directed by Kaneharu Mitsumura
: written by Kunio Fujii, directed by Michio Konishi
: written by Kyoko Sagiyama, directed by Michio Konishi
: written by Kenichi Araki, directed by Akihisa Okamoto
: written by Noboru Sugimura, directed by Akihisa Okamoto
: written by Susumu Takaku, directed by Takeshi Ogasawara
: written by Nobuo Ogizawa, directed by Takeshi Ogasawara
: written by Kyoko Sagiyama, directed by Michio Konishi
: written by Kenichi Araki, directed by Michio Konishi
: written by Noboru Sugimura and Kenichi Araki, directed by Akihisa Okamoto
: written by Noboru Sugimura, directed by Akihisa Okamoto

Film
A movie for the series, entitled The Mobile Cop Jiban: Great Explosion at the Monster Factory of Fear, was released on July 17, 1989, Special as part of the 1989 "Manga Matsuri" Special Festival.

 Written by Noboru Sugimura
 Directed by Michio Konishi

Cast
Naoto Tamura  Tokoro Hiroshi
Doctor Kenzo Igarashi  Hajime Izu
Doctor Giba  Leo Meneghetti
Mayumi Igarashi/Midori Hayakawa  Konomi Mashita
Youko Katagiri  Michiko Enokida
Ryo Hayakawa  Ryohei Kobayashi
Seiichi Yanagida  Akira Ishihama
Marsha  Ami Kawai
Karsha  Akemi Kogawa
Narrator  Toru Ohira
Kiyoshiro Muramatsu  Kunio Konishi
Mad Garbo  Kazuko Yanaga
Queen Cosmos  Yoko Asakura

Voice Actors
Doctor Giba  Shōzō Iizuka

Songs
Opening theme

Lyrics  Keisuke Yamakawa
Composition  Kisaburō SuzukiArrangement  Artist  Akira Kushida
Ending themeLyrics  Keisuke YamakawaComposition  Kisaburō SuzukiArrangement  Kazuya IzumiArtist'''  Akira Kushida

Media
Toei later released Jiban in DVD from June 21, 2009, to October 21, 2009. The series can now be streamed on Toei's YouTube channel called "Toei Tokusatsu Official".

References

External links 
 
Metal Hero FAQ

Fictional cyborgs
Fictional Japanese police officers
Japanese science fiction television series
Japanese television shows featuring puppetry
Metal Hero Series
1989 Japanese television series debuts
1990 Japanese television series endings
TV Asahi original programming
Biopunk television series
Cyberpunk television series